{{Infobox book
| name             = Blood Shot
| image            = Sara Paretsky - Blood Shot.jpg
| caption    = First edition
| author           = Sara Paretsky
| title_orig       = Toxic Shock '
| translator       = 
| illustrator      = 
| cover_artist     = 
| country          = 
| language         = 
| series           = V.I. Warshawski series
| subject          = 
| genre            = Mystery
| publisher        = Delacorte Press
| pub_date         = 1988
| english_pub_date = 
| media_type       = 
| pages            = 
| isbn             = 0440204208
| oclc             = 476821113
| dewey            = 
| congress         = 
| preceded_by      = Bitter Medicine(1987)
| followed_by      = Burn Marks(1990)
}}Blood Shot (marketed under the title Toxic Shock'' in the United Kingdom), published in New York in 1988, is the fifth in a series of novels by Sara Paretsky featuring her character V. I. Warshawski, a hard-boiled female private investigator.

Plot
V.I. Warshawski isn't crazy about going back to her old South Chicago neighborhood, but she's never been a woman who breaks a promise. Returning to her old neighborhood for a school reunion, she finds herself agreeing to search  for a childhood friend's missing father, a man her friend never knew and about whom her friend's dying mother will not speak. What ought to have been a routine missing-persons case rapidly turns up a homicide; and Warshawski must battle corrupt local politicians and businessmen, who do all they can to derail her investigation.

Awards
The novel was nominated for the 1989 Anthony Award in the "Best Novel" category.

References

External links

1988 American novels
American crime novels
Novels set in Chicago
Novels by Sarah Paretsky